EPH receptor A10 is a protein in humans that is encoded by the EPHA10 gene.

Ephrin receptors, the largest subfamily of receptor tyrosine kinases (RTKs), and their ephrin ligands are important mediators of cell-cell communication regulating cell attachment, shape, and mobility in neuronal and epithelial cells.

References